10 Seconds is a television game show that aired on The Nashville Network from March 29, 1993 to September 24, 1993. After the last episode aired, the show went in reruns until March 25, 1994. The show was hosted by Dan Miller and announced by Don Dashiell. Miller and Dashiell were also the host-announcer team for Top Card, the quiz show that 10 Seconds replaced on the schedule following its cancellation.

Maingame
Two contestants, one usually a returning champion, competed in a game of identifying songs.

Nine categories were displayed. Each category was the clue to the title of a song, and each one hid a point value. The player in control chose a category, revealing how many points the category was worth. The higher the points were, the more difficult the song would be to identify. After a category was chosen, Miller would tell the players the year the song was released, the singer's music style, whether the singer was a man or woman (or in other cases, whether it was sung by a duo or group), and the song's peak position on the Billboard music charts; if the song was a country song or pop song, the contestants were told of the peak position on either of those charts, while if the song reached the Billboard Hot 100 its peak position on that chart would be revealed.

Once all that information was revealed, it was up to the opposing player to decide how long the player would have to listen to the song. The opponent would choose a number of seconds of music to be played, between 1 and 10 seconds. At that point, the player who chose the category decided to play that song or pass it to their opponent. The clip would be played; answering correctly won the points while failure to come up with a correct answer gave the points to the opposing player. A player could only give each number of seconds once per round. The player that's trailing get the next category.

Two rounds were played. In the first round categories were worth between 10 and 50 points, in five-point increments, and it was possible for the same number to appear multiple times on the board. In the second round, points ranged from 20 to 100, still in five-point increment, and in addition, the last category left on the board at the end of the second round was played for double its value for a possible 200 points.

Catch-Up round
In the third and final round, called the "Catch-Up Round", the trailing player had a chance to earn up to 400 points. A ten-second medley of three songs were played and the player had to identify the artist behind each song. Each correct answer was worth 100 points, and a bonus of 100 points was given if the player got all three. If the trailer was able to catch and/or pass the leader, the leader was given his/her own ten second medley to try to regain the lead and win the game. Whichever player was ahead at the end of the Catch-Up round won the game, an additional prize and played the bonus round for a chance at a cash jackpot.

Note: The Catch-Up round was not played if the trailing player did not have enough points to be in catch-up range.

Bonus round
In the bonus round, the winning player was given 60 seconds to name nine songs. As before, there were nine categories on the game board. Unlike the front game, the categories were played in order, moving from left to right, top to bottom. The song fitting the category was played for several seconds. For each song the champion correctly identified, he/she won a prize and the prizes grew in value for each correct answer. If the champion could not identify the song fitting the category, it was blocked and could be tried again after all nine categories had been played (time permitting).

Getting all nine songs before time expired won the champion a cash jackpot, which started out at $2,500 (later $1,000) and increased by $500 each day until it was claimed. The highest jackpot won was $14,000. Champions continued until defeated or the jackpot was won.

References

Musical game shows
1990s American game shows
1993 American television series debuts
1993 American television series endings
English-language television shows